Eerikki Viljanen (born April 21, 1975 in Vihti, Finland) is a Finnish politician, representing the Centre Party in the Parliament of Finland since 2015. He was elected to the Parliament from the Uusimaa constituency in the 2015 elections with 2,902 votes. Viljanen has also served in the municipal council of Vihti 1997–2000 and again since 2005.

References

External links
 Home page of Eerikki Viljanen

1975 births
Living people
People from Vihti
Centre Party (Finland) politicians
Members of the Parliament of Finland (2015–19)